William Evans (7 November 1912 – 22 July 1976) was a professional footballer who played for Cardiff City, Tottenham Hotspur, Fulham and represented Wales on six occasions.

Football career 
Evans was born  in Waun-Lwyd and joined Spurs from Cardiff in 1931 after spells with Tottenham Juniors, Barnet and Hayward Sports.

Between 1931 and 1936 the outside left played a total of 195 matches and netting 86 goals in all competitions for the White Hart Lane club. The Welshman scored twice on his 'Lilywhites' debut in a 6-2 victory over Swansea City at White Hart Lane in November 1931 in the old Second Division.

Evans joined Fulham in 1937 and ended his football career at Craven Cottage.

Career statistics

International

Wales score listed first, score column indicates score after each Evans goal

References 

1912 births
1976 deaths
Footballers from Aberdare
Welsh footballers
Wales international footballers
English Football League players
Barnet F.C. players
Tottenham Hotspur F.C. players
Association football forwards